Potong gigi, also known as mesangih or mepandes, is a form of ritual body modification of adolescents, typically teenagers, in parts of Bali that involves the filing of the canine teeth. Traditional Balinese belief states that "protruding canines represent the animal-like nature of human beings"; the purpose of the ritual is to sever ties with these animal instincts and show others that the individual is old enough to marry. Considered a generational ritual, parents of adolescents performing it consider it their "final duty" in being a parent before their child becomes an adult. Reasons adolescents take part in the ceremony are mixed, as they must take into consideration the impacts of globalization with traditional Balinese ritual.

References 

Body modification
Indonesian culture